Vatten may refer to:

Vatten, Skye, a settlement near Harlosh on the island of Skye, Highland, Scotland
"Vatten" (song), 1981 Swedish song
Gunnar Vatten (1927–2011), Norwegian engineer and civil servant
Lars Vatten (born 1952), Norwegian epidemiologist